The Amazing Race 16 is the sixteenth season of the American reality television show The Amazing Race. It featured eleven teams of two competing in a race around the world.

The season premiered on CBS on Sunday, February 14, 2010, and the finale aired on May 9, 2010. In Canada, the show premiered on the A-Channel instead of CTV due to the 2010 Winter Olympics, but it returned to CTV after the Winter Olympics concluded.

Brothers Dan and Jordan Pious were the winners of this season, while cowboy brothers Jet McCoy and Cord McCoy finished in second place, and models Brent Horne and Caite Upton finished in third.

Production

Development and filming

Racers were observed leaving Los Angeles International Airport on November 28, 2009. Racers checked into a pit stop in Puerto Varas, Chile, on December 2, 2009. Filming of the show also was reported in Bariloche, Argentina, and Germany. Production crews were reported in Singapore, particularly in the Bugis area and the Singapore Flyer.

In the episode which aired on February 28, 2010, and featured the contestants departing Chile, Phil Keoghan acknowledged the February 27, 2010, Chilean earthquake in a special opening.

Leg 4 featured an Intersection for the first time since season 11. Additionally, teams did a Roadblock together for the first time, where one person from each of the Intersected teams worked together to complete the Roadblock.

Casting
Applications were originally due on July 10, 2009, but the deadline was extended. Semi-finalist interviews were held in August 2009 and the final casting interviews took place in Los Angeles in September and October 2009. Filming took place in November and December 2009.

Cast

Notable cast members included Big Brother 11 HouseGuests Jordan Lloyd and Jeff Schroeder, professional bull rider Cord McCoy, and Cleveland Indians third-base coach Steve Smith. Caite Upton was the 2007 Miss South Carolina Teen USA, who gained international notoriety after giving a convoluted response to a question asked to her during the Miss Teen USA 2007 pageant.

Future appearances
Jet & Cord raced again in The Amazing Race: Unfinished Business. They raced again in The Amazing Race: All Stars.

Jordan & Jeff competed on Big Brother 13 a year after this season. The two returned to the Big Brother house three years later on the thirty-third episode of Big Brother 16, where they got engaged. In 2015, they also appeared on Marriage Boot Camp: Reality Stars 3. On May 24, 2016, Jeff Schroeder appeared on a Big Brother-themed primetime special of The Price is Right. Jeff also appeared on the second episode of Big Brother: Over the Top to host a Power of Veto competition and on the penultimate episode of Big Brother 20.

Results
The following teams are listed with their placements in each leg. Placements are listed in finishing order. 
A  placement with a dagger indicates that the team was eliminated. 
An  placement with a double-dagger indicates that the team was the last to arrive at a pit stop in a non-elimination leg, and had to perform a Speed Bump task in the following leg. 
A  indicates that the team won the Fast Forward. 
A  indicates that the team used the U-Turn and a  indicates the team on the receiving end of the U-Turn. 
A  indicates that the teams encountered an Intersection.

Notes

Race summary

Leg 1 (United States → Chile)

Episode 1: "Nanna Is Kickin' Your Butt" (February 14, 2010)
Prize: A trip for two to Vancouver, British Columbia (awarded to Jordan & Jeff)
Eliminated: Dana & Adrian
Locations
Los Angeles, California (Vista Hermosa Natural Park) (Starting Line)
   Los Angeles → Los Angeles International Airport
 Los Angeles → Santiago, Chile
 Santiago → Valparaíso
Valparaíso (Ascensor Villaseca ) 
 Valparaíso (Ascensor Artillería)
Valparaíso (Paseo Templeman)
Valparaíso (Palacio Baburizza) 
Episode summary
Teams set off from Vista Hermosa Natural Park in Los Angeles, California, and had to travel by public transportation to Los Angeles International Airport, where they booked one of two American Airlines flights to Santiago, Chile. The first three teams received tickets on a flight that would have departed one hour ahead of the second flight; however, due to a mechanical failure on the first flight, those three teams were re-booked on the second flight with the remaining teams. After arriving in Santiago, teams had to travel by bus to Valparaíso.
After completing the Roadblock, teams had to take a funicular down the mountain to find their next clue.
At the Paseo Templeman, teams had to pick up painting supplies and find a group of house painters next to a house matching the color of their paint. Once at the house, they had to finish painting a portion of the house in order to receive their next clue.
Teams had to check in at the pit stop: the Palacio Baburizza in Valparaíso.
Additional notes
Dana & Adrian were unable to complete the Roadblock. After all of the other teams had already checked in at the pit stop, Phil came out to the Roadblock to inform them of their elimination.

Leg 2 (Chile)

Episode 2: "When the Cow Kicked Me in the Head" (February 21, 2010)
Prize: A pair of sailboats (awarded to Jet & Cord)
Eliminated: Jody & Shannon
Locations
Valparaíso (Palacio Baburizza) 
 Valparaíso → Santiago
 Santiago → Puerto Varas
 Vicente Pérez Rosales National Park (Hotel Petrohué) → Todos los Santos Lake (Isla Margarita – Mirador) 
Puerto Varas (Onces y Cabañas Bellavista) 
Puerto Varas (Iglesia del Sagrado Corazón de Jesús  – Gruta de la Virgen) 
Episode summary
At the beginning of this leg, teams had to travel by bus back to Santiago before boarding another bus to Puerto Varas. Once there, teams had to drive themselves to the Hotel Petrohué and then take a boat to Isla Margarita on Todos los Santos Lake in order to find their next clue.
 This season's first Detour was a choice between Llama Adoration or Condor Consternation. In Llama Adoration, teams traveled by boat to a farm where they had to properly dress a llama in order to receive their next clue. In Condor Consternation, teams traveled by boat to a beach where they used hang glider-like condor costumes to "fly" to their next clue in the water.
After completing the Detour, teams had to travel back to Puerto Varas and then make their way to the Onces y Cabañas Bellavista, where they found their next clue.
 In this leg's Roadblock, teams had to collect the ingredients to make Kuchen – including a plate of butter, a bowl of sugar, a bag of flour, a baker's dozen of eggs from a hen house, and a cup of milk from a cow – and then deliver them to the baker in order to receive a serving of Kuchen and their next clue.
Teams had to check in at the pit stop: the Iglesia del Sagrado Corazón de Jesús in Puerto Varas.

Leg 3 (Chile → Argentina)

Episode 3: "Run Like Scalded Dogs!" (February 28, 2010)
Prize: A trip for two to Patagonia (awarded to Jet & Cord)
Eliminated: Monique & Shawne
Locations
Puerto Varas (Iglesia del Sagrado Corazón de Jesús  – Gruta de la Virgen) 
 Puerto Varas → San Carlos de Bariloche, Argentina
Nahuel Huapi (El Boliche Viejo)
Nahuel Huapi (Peña Gaucha) 
Ñirihuau (Puente Ñirihuau) 
Neuquén Province (Estancia Fortin Chacabuco) 
Episode summary
At the beginning of this leg, teams were instructed to travel by bus to San Carlos de Bariloche, Argentina. Once there, teams had to make their way to El Boliche Viejo in Nahuel Huapi. Teams had to win a game of five-card stud against a Travelocity Roaming Gnome in order to receive the gnome with their next clue on its base, which directed them to the Peña Gaucha. Teams had to keep their gnome with them for the remainder of the leg.
After completing the Roadblock, teams had to travel to Puente Ñirihuau in order to find their next clue.
 This leg's Detour was a choice between Horse Sense or Horse Power. In Horse Sense, teams were given a set of directions and, using only a stationary compass, had to find a bag of loot buried in a field. They then delivered the bag to a bandit, and if the markings on their bag matched the coordinates given to them, he gave the team a coin imprinted with the name of the pit stop. In Horse Power, teams went to a polo field and, using a wooden practice horse, had to score a goal within nine strokes in order to receive a trophy imprinted with the name of the pit stop.
Teams had to check in at the pit stop: Estancia Fortin Chacabuco in Neuquén Province.

Leg 4 (Argentina → Germany)

Episode 4: "We Are No Longer in the Bible Belt" (March 7, 2010)
Prize: Two US$5,000 pre-loaded Discover Cards (awarded to Louie & Michael)
Locations
Neuquén Province (Estancia Fortin Chacabuco) 
 San Carlos de Bariloche → Frankfurt, Germany
 Frankfurt → Hamburg
Hamburg (Jungfernstieg) 
Hamburg (Port of Hamburg) 
Hamburg (Altonaer Rathaus  – Kaiser Wilhelm I Statue)
Hamburg (Adolf-Jäger-Kampfbahn Stadium   Alt-Hamburger Bürgerhaus) 
Hamburg (Haifischbar )
Hamburg (Beatles-Platz)
Hamburg (Reeperbahn – Indra Musikclub) 
Episode summary
At the beginning of this leg, teams were instructed to fly to Frankfurt, Germany, and then travel by train to Hamburg.
 After arriving in Hamburg, teams had to make their way to the Jungfernstieg, where they encountered an Intersection, which required two teams to join together to complete all tasks until further notice. The teams were paired up thusly: Dan & Jordan and Carol & Brandy, Jet & Cord and Louie & Michael, Brent & Caite and Jordan & Jeff, and Steve & Allie and Joe & Heidi.
 In this leg's Roadblock, one member from each of the newly-joined teams had to take the S-Bahn to the Port of Hamburg and complete a  tandem bungee jump in order to receive their next clue, which they couldn't open until they reunited with their partners. At this point, teams were no longer joined.
After completing the Roadblock, teams had to find the Kaiser Wilhelm I Statue at the Altonaer Rathaus in order to find their next clue.
 This leg's Detour was a choice between Soccer or Sauerkraut. In Soccer, teams traveled to the Adolf-Jäger-Kampfbahn Stadium and had to kick soccer balls from the penalty mark through five targets located in the goal in order to receive their next clue. In Sauerkraut, teams traveled to Alt-Hamburger Bürgerhaus restaurant and had to eat a plate of sauerkraut while a band played a song called the "Sauerkraut Polka". Teams had to finish the plate before the end of the song in order to receive their next clue. If the song ended before teams finished, they had to start over with a new plate of sauerkraut.
After completing the Detour, teams had to make their way to the Haifischbar, where each team had to drink a boot of beer in order to receive their next clue. Teams were directed to the Beatles-Platz, and then had to search through Hamburg's red-light district in order to find the pit stop: the Indra Musikclub.
Additional notes
This was a non-elimination leg.

Leg 5 (Germany → France)

Episode 5: "I Think We're Fighting the Germans, Right?" (March 14, 2010)
Prize: Two 55" HD TVs (awarded to Louie & Michael)
Eliminated: Joe & Heidi
Locations
 Hamburg → Les Monthairons, France 
Les Monthairons (Château des Monthairons ) 
Sainte-Menehould (Boulangerie Defontaine)
Massiges (La Main de Massiges )   
 Massiges (Church of Massiges) → Wargemoulin-Hurlus (Mairie) 
Episode summary
During the pit stop, all teams boarded a bus and traveled from Hamburg to an unknown destination (Les Monthairons, France). Teams began the leg at the Château des Monthairons and were instructed to purchase a fresh baguette at the Boulangerie Defontaine. Their next clue was baked into the baguette.
 This leg's Detour was a choice between In the Trenches or Under Fire. For both tasks, teams dressed as World War I-era American soldiers. In In the Trenches, teams traveled through trenches to a telegraph, where they deciphered a message in Morse code – "We will prevail; Vive la France" – and presented their deciphered message to the French sergeant in exchange for the next clue. In Under Fire, teams crawled  under barbed wire to receive a message – "The war is over; Vive la liberté" – from a man in a foxhole. They then crawled back to present the message to the sergeant. After completing either task, teams had to send their message to "headquarters" via carrier pigeon in order to receive their next clue.
 For their Speed Bump, Jordan & Jeff had to reinforce a trench wall with branches before they could continue racing.
After completing the Detour, teams had to travel to the Church of Massiges, where they changed out of their doughboy gear and into inaugural Tour de France bicycling gear, and then rode on antique bicycles along a  course to the pit stop: the town hall of Wargemoulin-Hurlus.
Additional notes
 Louie & Michael chose to use the U-Turn on Joe & Heidi.
Joe & Heidi failed to complete the second Detour option that they had to do as a result of being U-Turned. After all of the other teams had already checked in at the pit stop, Phil came out to the Detour location to inform them of their elimination.

Leg 6 (France)

Episode 6: "Cathy Drone?" (March 21, 2010)
Prize: A trip for two to Cancún, Mexico (awarded to Louie & Michael)
Eliminated: Jordan & Jeff
Locations
Massiges (La Main de Massiges) 
Reims (Reims Cathedral – Joan of Arc Statue)
Épernay (Leclerc Briant) 
Pierry (Château de la Marquetterie ) 
Épernay (l'ORCCA – La Maison Gallice) 
Episode summary
At the beginning of this leg, teams had to find a woman playing a musical saw outside the Reims Cathedral in order to receive their next clue: a cork from a bottle of Leclerc Briant, whose winery was their next destination.
 In this leg's Roadblock, one team member had to rappel  into the chalk cellars of Leclerc Briant's winery and search for a bottle of champagne marked with a small yellow and red striped flag amongst the riddling racks. Once they found the bottle, they returned to the surface and used a traditional sabrage technique to open the bottle, the force of which propelled out their next clue.
After completing the Roadblock, teams had to travel to the Château de la Marquetterie in Pierry, where they found their next clue.
 This leg's Detour was a choice between Tower or Terra. In Tower, teams had to stack champagne saucers into a 15-level pyramid with only one glass on the top level, and then pour the entire contents of a magnum of champagne onto the top of the pyramid without breaking any of the glasses in order to receive their next clue. In Terra, teams had to search the  vineyards for a cluster of wine grapes marked with an Amazing Race flag, which they could exchange for their next clue.
Teams had to check in at the pit stop: La Maison Gallice in Épernay.

Leg 7 (France → Seychelles)

Episode 7: "Anonymous?" (March 28, 2010)
Prize: A dinner on the beach and massages in the Seychelles, and $7,000 for each team member (awarded to Steve & Allie)
Locations
Épernay (l'ORCCA – La Maison Gallice) 
 Paris → Victoria, Seychelles
 Pointe La Rue → L'Union
L'Union (L'Union Estate) 
 La Passe → St. Pierre Island 
 St. Pierre Island → Praslin
Anse Volbert (Paradise Sun Hotel) 
Episode summary
At the beginning of this leg, teams were instructed to fly from Paris to the Seychelles. After arriving in Victoria, teams had to find a marked kiosk in the airport and take a number. The first three teams could then board one of three helicopters leaving at the same time to the island of La Digue. The last three teams departed one hour later.
 This leg's Detour was a choice between Turtle Toddle or Ox Trot. In Ox Trot, teams pulled a cart to a clearing where they had to load a pile of coconuts. After an ox was hitched to their cart, teams had to deliver the coconuts to the same fruit merchant in order to receive their clue. If teams lost any of their coconuts, they had to retrieve them in order to complete the task.
After finishing the Detour, teams had to swim to a marked boat and travel to a buoy near St. Pierre Island, where the captain gave them their next clue.
 In this leg's Roadblock, one team member had to dive into the ocean and retrieve one of seven bottles tied to a platform in the water.
After finishing the Roadblock, teams were taken to near the shoreline of Praslin and had to swim to land. Once on shore, teams had to empty the contents of their bottle to reveal a puzzle map that, when assembled, led them to the pit stop at the Paradise Sun Hotel.
Additional notes
Due to limited availability of flights, teams were provided tickets on the same flight to the Seychelles.
This was a non-elimination leg.

Leg 8 (Seychelles → Malaysia)

Episode 8: "You're Like Jason Bourne, Right?" (April 4, 2010)
Prize: A trip for two to Maui, Hawaii (awarded to Jet & Cord)
Eliminated: Steve & Allie
Locations
Anse Volbert (Paradise Sun Hotel) 
 Baie Saint Anne → Victoria
 Victoria → George Town, Malaysia
Bayan Lepas (Snake Temple)
George Town (Tien Kong Than Temple  Esplanade) 
Teluk Bahang (Kuil Sri Singamuga Kaliamman) 
Teluk Bahang (Tropical Spice Garden) 
George Town (Pinang Peranakan Mansion) 
Episode summary
At the beginning of this leg, teams were instructed to travel by boat to Victoria, and then fly to George Town, Malaysia. Once in George Town, teams had to make their way to the Snake Temple, where they found their next clue.
 This leg's Detour was a choice between Buddhist Tradition or Chinese Custom. In Buddhist Tradition, teams traveled to the Tien Kong Than Temple and carried a series of joss sticks to the top of the temple. After arranging them in the proper order, teams lit them and then received their next clue. In Chinese Custom, teams traveled to the Esplanade, where they participated in the Chinese New Year tradition of balancing large flags on their foreheads and running across the esplanade. After both team members made it across the esplanade without letting their flags fall, they received their next clue.
After completing the Detour, teams had to travel to Kuil Sri Singamuga Kaliamman in Teluk Bahang, where they found their next clue. 
 In this leg's Roadblock, one team member had to prepare a traditional Hindu offering called a float by breaking open several coconuts in order to find one that had colored flesh. They then had to build the float and give it to the waiting Gurukkal, who sent it out to sea and then gave racers their next clue.
 For their Speed Bump, Jet & Cord traveled to the Tropical Spice Garden, where they found a woman crushing spices for tea. Then, by smell, they had to choose the correct prepared tea and serve it to a guru sitting on a swing. Once the guru finished drinking the tea, they could continue racing.
Teams had to check in at the pit stop: the Pinang Peranakan Mansion in George Town.

Leg 9 (Malaysia → Singapore)

Episode 9: "Dumb Did Us In" (April 11, 2010)
Prize: A pair of motorcycles (awarded to Dan & Jordan)
Eliminated: Carol & Brandy
Locations
George Town (Pinang Peranakan Mansion) 
 Sungai Nibong → Kuala Lumpur
 Kuala Lumpur → Singapore
Singapore (Victoria Theatre and Concert Hall)
Singapore (Singapore Flyer) 
Singapore (Speakers' Corner  Rochor Road) 
Singapore (Istana Park) 
Singapore (ASL Marine Shipyard) 
Singapore (Sentosa – MegaZip Adventure Park)
Singapore (Marina Barrage) 
Episode summary
At the beginning of this leg, teams were instructed to travel by bus to Kuala Lumpur and then by train to Singapore. Once in Singapore, teams had to make their way to the Victoria Theatre and Concert Hall, where they had to find Allan Wu, the host of The Amazing Race Asia, who gave them their next clue.
 In this season's only Fast Forward, one team traveled to the Singapore Flyer, where they had to climb out of an observation pod at the top of the  Ferris wheel and cross a ladder to the next pod. Dan & Jordan won the Fast Forward.
 This leg's Detour was a choice between Pounding The Drums or Pounding The Pavement. In Pounding The Drums, teams traveled to Speakers' Corner, where they had to learn a complex drum routine for a lion dance performance and correctly perform the routine with a dance troupe in order to receive their next clue. In Pounding The Pavement, teams traveled to an open area on Rochor Road, where they had to deliver supplies to a marked ice cream cart and sell twenty-five Singaporean-style ice cream sandwiches in order to receive their next clue.
After completing the Detour, teams were instructed to find their next clue at the intersection of their "last pit stop city" (Penang) and Orchard Road, sending them to Istana Park at the intersection of Penang Road and Orchard Road.
 In this leg's Roadblock, one team member had to inspect an anchor chain by counting the number of links, while dealing with noise created by the workers at the port and announcements from a loudspeaker, and write the correct number down on a clipboard in order to receive their next clue.
Teams had to check in at the pit stop: the Marina Barrage in Singapore.
Additional notes
 Brent & Caite chose to use the U-Turn on Carol & Brandy.

Leg 10 (Singapore → China)

Episode 10: "I Feel Like I'm in, Like, Sicily" (April 25, 2010)
Prize: A trip for two to Alaska (awarded to Jet & Cord)
Locations
Singapore (Marina Barrage) 
 Singapore → Shanghai, China
Shanghai (Zhujiajiao) 
Shanghai (Tianzifang – Deke Erh Art Center)
Shanghai (Hongkou Football Stadium) 
 Shanghai (Shanghai Science and Technology Museum) 
Episode summary
At the beginning of this leg, teams were instructed to fly to Shanghai, China. Once in Shanghai, teams had to make their way to Zhujiajiao and travel on foot to a boat dock, where they rode a boat to their next clue.
 In this leg's first Roadblock, one team member had to make  of lamian noodles in order to receive their next clue from He Pingping, the world's shortest man.
After completing the first Roadblock, teams had to travel to the Deke Erh Art Center in Tianzifang, where they entered a fashion studio and chose a sketch of an outfit. They then had to choose the correct pieces of clothing as shown in the sketch and give them to a fashion model to wear. If they chose the right clothing and accessories, the fashion designer gave them their next clue, which sent teams to Hongkou Football Stadium.
 In this leg's second Roadblock, the team member who did not perform the previous Roadblock had to assemble a 96-piece puzzle and give the puzzle pieces to a group of fans in the bleachers. If assembled correctly, the puzzle pieces, when flipped over, revealed the seat number where teams could find their next clue.
After completing the second Roadblock, teams had to travel by train to the Shanghai Science and Technology Museum and search for the pit stop.
Additional notes
He Pingping died about three months after the episode was filmed and one month before it aired. The episode concluded with the message in his memory.
This was a non-elimination leg.

Leg 11 (China)

Episode 11: "They Don't Even Understand Their Own Language" (May 2, 2010)
Prize: A trip for two to the Costa del Sol in Spain (awarded to Brent & Caite)
Eliminated: Louie & Michael
Locations
Shanghai (Shanghai Science and Technology Museum) 
Shanghai (Garden Bridge)
Shanghai (Longhua Temple)  
Shanghai (Yuyuan Garden)
Shanghai (Art Stone Store  Nanxiang Steamed Bun Restaurant) 
Shanghai (Riverside Promenade ) 
Episode summary
At the beginning of this leg, teams were instructed to go to the Garden Bridge in order to find their next clue.
 For their Speed Bump, Louie & Michael had to participate in a good luck ritual by each tossing one coin into the top opening of the large incense burner on the Longhua Temple grounds before they could continue racing.
 In this leg's Roadblock, one team member had to enter Arhat Hall at the Longhua Temple and count all of the golden statues in the room in order to receive their next clue. If their guess was incorrect, they had to wait ten minutes before making another guess.
After completing the Roadblock, teams traveled by motorcycle to the Yuyuan Garden, where they found their next clue.
 This season's final Detour was a choice between Pork Chops or Pork Dumplings. In Pork Chops, teams entered an art stone store and looked through several hundred special stone stamps called chops for the two that had a pig on the bottom and one with each of their names in order to receive their next clue. In Pork Dumplings, teams had to travel to Nanxiang Steamed Bun Restaurant and deliver ten orders of xiaolongbao across the market in order to receive their next clue.
Teams had to check in at the pit stop: the Riverside Promenade in Shanghai.
Additional notes
Bao Xishun, the world's tallest man at the time, was the pit stop greeter in this leg.

Leg 12 (China → United States)

Episode 12: "Huger than Huge" (May 9, 2010)
Winners: Dan & Jordan
Second Place: Jet & Cord
Third Place: Brent & Caite
Locations
Shanghai (Riverside Promenade ) 
 Shanghai → San Francisco, California
San Francisco (Fort Point – Battery Godfrey)
San Francisco (Coit Tower) 
San Francisco (Letterman Digital Arts Center – Yoda Fountain & Industrial Light & Magic)
San Francisco (Fairmont San Francisco – Tonga Room)
San Francisco (Great American Music Hall)
San Francisco (Candlestick Park) 
Episode summary
At the beginning of this leg, teams were instructed to fly to San Francisco, California. Once in San Francisco, teams had travel to Battery Godfrey in Fort Point in order to receive their next clue, which was a riddle: "I was built in 1933. I'm 210 feet tall. My insides are lined with mural from 26 different artists. What am I?". Teams had to figure out that their next destination was Coit Tower.
 In this season's final Roadblock, one team member had to use an ascender to reach the top archways of Coit Tower in order to get their next clue before being lowered back to the ground. 
After completing the Roadblock, teams had to make their way to Industrial Light & Magic, where one team member had to put on a motion capture suit and enter a sound stage while their partner directed them to walk an avatar through a virtual course based on Star Wars: The Clone Wars. After getting through two levels of the course, the directing partner had to copy down their next clue from a computer screen which directed them to the Tonga Room.
Teams had to carry a trunk from the Tonga Room to their next location: the Great American Music Hall. Once there, teams opened their trunk, which contained eight psychedelic posters of the eliminated teams and three posters for the non-elimination legs. Teams had to arrange the posters in chronological order in order to receive their final clue.
{| class="wikitable unsortable" style="text-align:center;"
! scope="col" |Leg
! scope="col" |Team
|-
! scope="row" | 1
|Dana & Adrian
|-
! scope="row" | 2
|Jody & Shannon
|-
! scope="row" | 3
|Monique & Shawne
|-
! scope="row" | 4
|Non-Elimination
|-
! scope="row" | 5
|Joe & Heidi
|-
! scope="row" | 6
|Jordan & Jeff
|-
! scope="row" | 7
|Non-Elimination
|-
! scope="row" | 8
|Steve & Allie
|-
! scope="row" | 9
|Carol & Brandy
|-
! scope="row" | 10
|Non-Elimination
|-
! scope="row" | 11
|Louie & Michael
|}
The final clue was a portion of the "Jack Be Nimble" nursery rhyme; teams had to figure out that the missing word "candlestick" referred to the location of the finish line: Candlestick Park.

Elimination Station 
The first five eliminated teams were sequestered at a villa in Puerto Vallarta, Mexico, to await the finale. CBS posted short videos on its website after each episode to show the eliminated teams interacting at the villa.

After Leg 1, Dana & Adrian were the first team eliminated. They expressed their disappointment after Adrian's second attempt failed during the Roadblock task. Adrian is terribly afraid of heights, and he wanted to kiss Dana to reaffirm their relationship. They discussed their marriage, had a tour on a beach, and saw whales in the ocean.
After Leg 2, Jody & Shannon were the second team eliminated. Jody voiced her regrets that she did the Roadblock instead of Shannon. Adrian was surprised to hear that Jody had not hoped or expected to win The Amazing Race, but Shannon still insisted that they could have won. The teams were awarded an elemental spa with treatments based on fire, earth, water, and air.
After Leg 3, Monique & Shawne were the third team eliminated. All previously eliminated teams were shocked to see Monique & Shawne who explained how they had a long day which led to their elimination and were saddened at missing their daughters' birthdays. The next day, the teams went to Las Juantas Y Los Veranos to make tequila, which included Adrian cutting open a blue agave in 6 minutes and 9 seconds.
Leg 4 was a non-elimination leg. The 3 eliminated teams bonded at the villa while Shannon was writing in her journal. Monique and Shawne suggested bringing Shannon to the beach, after which all the teams went. Shawne was given a leg and foot massage, while Shannon got her hair beaded, and Monique shared with Shannon how to win the Mexican guys with eye action.
After Leg 5, Joe & Heidi were the fourth team eliminated. They arrived while Adrian and Shannon were playing a game of table tennis. Jody & Shannon expressed their surprise and disappointment at seeing Joe & Heidi arrive, while Adrian was glad to have another man at the villa. Joe & Heidi expressed their frustration and explained how they arrived at the conclusion that Louie & Michael had Blind U-Turned them. Later, the teams went to town to shop. Joe tried to bargain with a store owner over the price of some jewelry for Heidi, which offended the owner.
After Leg 6, Jordan & Jeff were the fifth team eliminated. All the teams at the villa had a meal.  As Jordan & Jeff arrived at the villa, they explained the circumstances that led to their elimination (struggling with navigation). They believed that Louie & Michael would be in the top 3.  Joe again shared his disdain for Louie & Michael in a confessional. Jeff expressed his bitterness at having been evicted from Big Brother and now eliminated from The Amazing Race as he compares Elimination Station and Big Brother and Jury House. However, Jordan was satisfied from being in Elimination Station. The teams later went on a snorkeling trip. While on the trip, Monique & Shawne suffered from seasickness, and Heidi helped Adrian become comfortable in the water. The snorkeling trip also helped ease Jeff's bitterness at being eliminated.
Leg 7 was a non-elimination leg. At the pool, Adrian, Jeff, and Joe discussed how Louie & Michael U-Turned Joe & Heidi, because the detectives disliked them for personal reasons. The eliminated teams watched an exciting Mexican dance, and many of the racers joined in the dance. Jody performed a solo by playing the drum, which impressed Shannon. Later in the day, Joe shared with Heidi the main reason why Louie and Michael U-Turned them. Heidi added that if Joe were to meet Louie and Michael, he would confront them about it and how it affected the outcome of the season.
After Leg 8, Steve & Allie were the sixth team eliminated. At 2:00 a.m. the eliminated teams gathered to speculate on the next eliminated team. Steve & Allie called the villa, and Monique picked up the phone. Everyone was surprised and disappointed to hear that Steve & Allie were eliminated, especially Shannon. Joe then asked Steve about Louie & Michael's current situation in the season. Steve told Joe that his team was too strong and was a threat, which resulted in the U-Turn. Steve shared that bad decisions and a bad cab resulted in their elimination. Steve also said that either Jet & Cord or Louie & Michael would win the season.
After Leg 9, Carol & Brandy were the seventh team eliminated. When Carol & Brandy called the villa early in the morning, the other eliminated teams were shocked and disappointed to hear of their elimination, especially Shannon who wanted an all-girl team win. Carol & Brandy talked about the U-Turn and their dislike for Brent & Caite that led to their elimination. In response, Jordan said that Carol & Brandy were probably jealous of Caite's beauty. Adrian, however, agreed with Carol & Brandy that them getting U-Turned was personal and that otherwise it could have been used on either Jet & Cord or Louie & Michael. That evening, the eliminated racers got to watch a Mexican wrestling match in an outdoor coliseum. Jordan got to escort a wrestler to the ring, and Adrian, the most enthusiastic fan of the group, bought a wrestling mask as a souvenir.
Leg 10 was a non-elimination leg. Jordan & Jeff talked with Dana and Adrian about how to strengthen their relationship. Then, all the teams at Elimination Station packed their bags and guessed where the final Leg would take place. Then left the villa and flew to End City.
After Leg 11, Louie & Michael were the eighth and final team eliminated. Elimination Station showed the five eliminated teams arriving at the End City in San Francisco, California. After arriving in San Francisco, the teams checked into a hotel, settled into their rooms, and awaited the phone call from the eighth team eliminated. Monique & Shawne were happy to see the end of the season. Dana said that Joe & Heidi hoped that Louie & Michael were not in the Final Three because of their dislike for them after being U-Turned. Louie & Michael called to the hotel, and the eliminated teams were shocked and disappointed to hear that Louie & Michael were eliminated. Joe asked Louie & Michael if they still felt that they had used the U-Turn correctly. Michael said yes because he thought Joe & Heidi would be tough to beat once the route reached Asia. Despite Louie and Michael being eliminated, Joe was still not satisfied. Jeff told Joe that Louie & Michael U-Turned Joe & Heidi because of personal reasons, which led to harsh words between Joe and Jeff. Joe concluded by saying that he will confront Louie and Michael the next time he sees them.
Leg 12 was the final leg of The Amazing Race 16. Elimination Station showed the Finish Line in Candlestick Park. All the eliminated teams were happy to find out which team they thought would win $1,000,000. Steve & Allie, Carol & Brandy, and Louie & Michael reunited with the other eliminated teams at the Finish Line. Shannon noticed that the Final Three teams were Dan & Jordan, Brent & Caite, and Jet & Cord. Dana said that it's anybody's race. All the eliminated teams were waiting to find out who would cross the Finish Line first and win the $1,000,000. Dan & Jordan were the first team to cross the Finish Line and win the $1 million; Jet & Cord came in 2nd, and Brent & Caite came in 3rd. Teams expressed their opinions about the final three teams at the Finish Line along with their joys and disappointments about the season and the learning experiences they could draw from the experience.

Reception

Critical response
The Amazing Race 16 received mostly negative reviews. Andy Dehnart of reality blurred called it a "relatively weak season". Michael Hewitt of the Orange County Register wrote that "stupidity and luck ruled, and the game-changing plays came via two lethal U-Turns. As TV in general goes, season 16 was fine entertainment. But as 'The Amazing Race' goes, it was a disappointment." Daniel Fienberg of HitFix wrote that "there were too many dull teams and too many dull tasks and too little rewarding of excellence or punishing of the stupidity that ran amuck all season long. This group of contestants got to see some great locations and do some great stuff, but nothing was hard enough or challenging enough. Even a lame season of 'The Amazing Race' is still better than most of what passes for reality TV. Perhaps, though, this 'Amazing Race' installment has just paled in comparison to a classic All-Star edition of 'Survivor' currently being played out." In 2016, this season was ranked 24th out of the first 27 seasons by the Rob Has a Podcast Amazing Race correspondents. Conversely, Luke Dwyer of TV Fanatic called this season a blast, praised the locations and tasks, and said that it "was one of the more entertaining in recent memory and Dan and Jordan's victory was well deserved."

Ratings
No episode aired on April 18, 2010 due to CBS's broadcast of the Academy of Country Music Awards and CTV's broadcast of the Juno Awards.

U.S. Nielsen ratings

Episode 1, "Nanna Is Kickin' Your Butt" aired on Valentine's Day, which is also the first day of Chinese New Year and the opening week of the 2010 Winter Olympics.
Episode 4, "We Are No Longer In The Bible Belt" had a considerably low number of viewers, most likely because it aired on the same night as the 82nd Academy Awards.
Episode 7, "Anonymous?" had the most viewers and adults 25–54 rating since the November 4, 2007, episode of The Amazing Race 12, as well as the best numbers in adults 18–49 since the January 6, 2008, episode of the same season.
Episode 8, "You're like Jason Bourne, right?" aired on Easter Sunday.
Episode 12, "Huger Than Huge", the season finale, aired on Mother's Day. The show was down nearly two million viewers compared to the season 15 finale and was the lowest rated finale since season 4.

Canadian ratings
Canadian broadcaster CTV also aired The Amazing Race on Sundays at 8 p.m. The first three episodes were aired on A-Channel. When the show returned to the said network, episode four aired an hour earlier than its normal start time due to the network's broadcast of the 82nd Academy Awards.

References

External links
Official website

 16
2010 American television seasons
Television shows filmed in California
Television shows filmed in Chile
Television shows filmed in Argentina
Television shows filmed in Germany
Television shows filmed in France
Television shows filmed in Seychelles
Television shows filmed in Malaysia
Television shows filmed in Singapore
Television shows filmed in Shanghai